Zero power critical is a condition of nuclear fission reactors that is useful for characterizing the reactor core.  A reactor is in the zero power critical state if it is sustaining a stable fission chain reaction with no significant growth or decay in the reaction rate, and at a low enough level that thermal considerations are not important to the reaction.  For example, a reactor that can produce gigawatts of heat might be considered zero-power critical when producing 100 watts of heat through a fission chain reaction. 

Most nuclear reactors are held at a zero-power critical condition as part of the start-up sequence, to assess the condition of the reactor itself.

Nuclear reactors